Arthur Leist (8 July 1852 – 22 March 1927) was a German writer, journalist and translator of Georgian and Armenian literature.

He was born and educated at Breslau. During the Russo-Turkish War (1877–1878), he got interested in the Caucasus. After his three visits to Georgia between 1884 and 1892, Leist decided to permanently settle in Tiflis. He regularly wrote on the history, ethnography and culture of Georgia, and translated many pieces of classic Georgian and Armenian literature. He compiled the first anthology of Georgian poetry in German in 1887 and, with the help of the Georgian writer Ilia Chavchavadze, published the complete German translation of the medieval Georgian epic poem The Knight in the Panther's Skin by Shota Rustaveli in 1889.  From 1906 to 1922, he edited Kaukasische Post, the only newspaper of the Caucasian German community. He died in Tiflis and was buried at the Didube Pantheon.

Works 

Georgien: Natur, Sitten und Bewohner. W. Friedrich, Leipzig 1885
Litterarische Skizzen. W. Friedrich, Leipzig 1886 (Hrsg. Abgar Johannissiany)
Drei Erzählungen von Raphael Patkanian. W. Friedrich, Leipzig 1886
Georgische Dichter. W. Friedrich, Leipzig, 1887
Armenische Dichter. E. Pierson, Dresden 1898
Schota Rustaweli: Der Mann Im Tigerfelle (translation) E. Pierson, Dresden 1898
Das Georgische Volk. E. Pierson, Dresden, 1903
Kacheti. Tiflis, 1927
Sakartvelos guli, Tbilisi 1963
Das Bildungsstreben der Georgier und Armenier. In: Gazeta Polska, Nr. 66, 1882
Eine vergessene Literatur. In: Magazin für die Literatur des In- und Auslandes, 20.1.1883
Kolchidaschi, In: Iveria, Nr. IV-V, 1885, S. 164-211
Georgische Sprichwörter. In: Aus fremden Zungen, Nr. 9, 1900

References 

 Schota Rewischwili: Arthur Leist und die georgischen Schriftsteller. Wissenschaftliche Zeitschrift / Friedrich-Schiller-Universität Jena, Gesellschafts- und sprachwissenschaftliche Reihe, 26(1977)1, S. 97-103

1852 births
1927 deaths
Burials at Didube Pantheon
German journalists
German male journalists
Russian and Soviet-German people
Armenian studies scholars
Kartvelian studies scholars
German translators
Translators from Armenian
Translators from Georgian
Translators to German
German male writers